12 Regiment Royal Artillery is a regiment of the Royal Artillery in the British Army. It currently serves in the air defence role, and is equipped with the Starstreak missile.

History
The regiment was established in 1947 when 7th Regiment, Royal Horse Artillery, was retitled 12th Anti-Tank Regiment Royal Artillery. It was deployed to Palestine that year, to Libya in 1948 and Trieste in 1950. It also saw action in Malaya in 1963 and Borneo in 1964. Units saw tours in Northern Ireland during the Troubles in 1971, 1974, 1977, 1979 and 1988. T Battery and 9 Battery were sent to the South Atlantic during the Falklands War in 1982. T Battery and 58 Battery saw action during the Gulf War in 1991.  12 Battery was deployed for the 2003 invasion of Iraq.

In January 2008, the regiment moved to the Baker Barracks, Thorney Island, upon its return from Germany.

Under Army 2020 Refine, T Battery was re-roled from the headquarters battery to form a further Stormer HVM battery while 170 (Imjin) Battery was brought out of suspended animation to take their place as headquarters battery.

Batteries as of 2014
The batteries are as follows:
170 (Imjin) Battery Royal Artillery - Headquarters Battery, Divisional Air Defence Cell
T Battery (Shah Sujah's Troop) Royal Artillery - Self Propelled HVM Stormer (Starstreak & Lightweight Multirole Missile)
9 (Plassey) Battery Royal Artillery - Self Propelled HVM Stormer (Starstreak & Lightweight Multirole Missile)
12 (Minden) Air Assault Battery Royal Artillery - Lightweight Multiple Launcher Starstreak & Lightweight Multirole Missile
58 (Eyre's) Battery Royal Artillery - Self Propelled HVM Stormer (Starstreak & Lightweight Multirole Missile)

References

External links
Official site

Royal Artillery regiments
Air defence regiments of the British Army
Military units and formations established in 1947